Edward Stopford may refer to:

Edward Stopford (British Army officer) (1766–1837), Anglo-Irish soldier and politician
Edward Stopford (bishop) (died 1850), Bishop of Meath
Edward Stopford (priest) (1810–1874), Irish Anglican priest, son of the bishop